The Dark Talent is a juvenile fiction novel by Brandon Sanderson, published in September 2016 by Tor Books. The book is named after its main character, Alcatraz Smedry, and is the fifth novel in the Alcatraz series.

Plot Summary
In the long-awaited final book in the Alcatraz Versus the Evil Librarians series, Alcatraz is going to the center of Librarian power. After the Librarians fire missiles at Tuki Tuki, the Smedrys, led by Alcatraz, must leave at once. They fly to Washington D.C. to enter the Highbrary, a huge cave complex beginning at the Library of Congress and continuing beneath the city. Among the endless sections and subsections of the ultimate library among the nooks and crannies of the cave, Alcatraz, Grandpa Smedry, and Alcatraz's uncle Kazan, along with the Crystin knight Draulin and the quirky Dif Smedry search for Alcatraz's father Attica, to stop him from unknowingly using his research to end Free Kingdom civilization.

Alcatraz and his mother locate Alcatraz's father, who knocks out his mother to prevent her from stopping him. He then tries to explain to Alcatraz what he is doing, in hopes of showing him he is doing the "right" thing. Dif comes, along with Grandpa Smedry, and after confirming everyone is there, Dif shoots Grandpa Smedry in the head and reveals himself to be Biblioden, the leader of the Librarians.The members of the team are captured, and Biblioden prepares a ritual for a bloodforged lens. He lets Alcatraz and his father choose which of them will be sacrificed, and Alcatraz, in a moment of weakness, chooses his father. Eventually the remainder of the shattered team locates Alcatraz, sitting in front of his father's corpse. They quickly leave before the Highbrary is self-destructed by a system put into motion by Grandpa Smedry.

In an extra page at the very end of the book, it is revealed that after Grandpa Smedry was shot, his Smedry Talent, accidentally broken by Alcatraz, comes back, making him arrive late to his death and survive.

New Non-Smedrys

 Dif Smedry, a quirky character picked up by the Smedrys for the infiltration, who seems to be overdoing his Smedry-like mannerisms and eventually turns out to be Biblioden.

Smedrys 
The Smedrys all have a special "talent". This talent may seem unhelpful at first, but it helps them in strange ways in the series. Here are the Smedrys featured in the book and their "Talents".

 Alcatraz, the main character, has the ability to break things, which can sometimes help him by breaking things in special ways.
 Leavenworth, or "Grandpa Smedry", has the ability to arrive late to things, which helps him arrive late to things like wounds and disasters. This allows him to arrive late to his death at the end of the book.
 Attica, Alcatraz's father, has the ability to lose things, which can allow him to find important things again in random places when he needs them.
 Shasta, Alcatraz's mother, is a Librarian, though she still wants to stop Attica and helps Alcatraz temporarily. She is married to Attica, and thus has his talent of losing things.
 Folsom, a book critic, has the ability of dancing badly, which includes uncontrollably attacking people nearby while music is playing.
 Himalaya, a Librarian defector, is married to Folsom and shares his talent of dancing badly. She and Folsom, at the beginning of the book, were helping Librarians defect in the "Hushlands", or the Librarian-controlled areas.

Oculators 
Oculators are people who can use special types of glasses, or "Lenses", as they are called. Oculators are very uncommon, and the only ones mentioned in the series are those from the pure Smedry line and the Librarian "Dark Oculators". Some "Lenses" used in this book are Oculator's Lenses, which allow Oculators to see special kinds of glass, Lenses, and Oculators in certain colors. Shamefiller's Lenses allow you to make objects and people so ashamed that they explode. Shaper's Lenses allow you to see someone's innermost beliefs, ideals or thoughts about themselves. Concussor's Lenses allow you to make people looking directly at you fall unconscious. Disguiser's Lenses allow you to look like anyone or anything, though the thing has to be wearing Lenses, and Translator's Lenses, some of the most important in this book, allow you to read any language.

References

2016 American novels
Tor Books books
Alcatraz series